David John Wilson Reid of Robertland (1929 – 20 December 1973) was a Scottish barrister, officer of arms and archivist.

Reid studied law at Trinity College, Cambridge and The Hague Academy of International Law. Between 1955 and 1973 he was archivist at the University of Glasgow, and he was a founder and chairman of the Business Archives Council of Scotland. He was a Fellow of the Society of Antiquaries of Scotland. In 1967 he was adopted as prospective parliamentary candidate for the Conservatives for the constituency of West Fife. Reid was Carrick Pursuivant of the Court of the Lord Lyon between January and December 1973. He held the Barony of Robertland in East Ayrshire.

He married Diana Rosamond Angell, secretary of the Baronetage of Scotland; their daughter Jonet Clemency Wilson Reid married Sir Edward Hunter-Blair, 8th Baronet.

References

1929 births
1973 deaths
Alumni of Trinity College, Cambridge
Fellows of the Society of Antiquaries of Scotland
Scottish archivists
Scottish barristers
Scottish officers of arms
The Hague Academy of International Law people